FC Buran Voronezh was a Russian football team from Voronezh. It played professionally in 1990 and 1991 in the Soviet Second League B.

Team name history
 1954–1958: FC Krylia Sovetov-2 Voronezh
 1959–1962: FC Trud-klubnaya Voronezh
 1963–1967: FC Mashinostroitel Voronezh
 1968–1976: FC Zenit Voronezh
 1977–1993: FC Buran Voronezh

External links
  Team history by footballfacts

Sport in Voronezh
Association football clubs established in 1954
Association football clubs disestablished in 1993
Defunct football clubs in Russia
1954 establishments in the Soviet Union
1993 disestablishments in Russia